The Bottom of the Bottle is a 1956 CinemaScope American drama film based on the novel written by Georges Simenon during his stay in Nogales, Arizona. The novel was adapted for film by Sydney Boehm and directed by Henry Hathaway.

Plot
Patrick Martin (Joseph Cotten), known as P.M., is a wealthy attorney and rancher in the border town of Nogales, Arizona. He returns home to find his brother Donald (Van Johnson) hiding in his garage. A former drunkard, Donald had been sent to the penitentiary five years previously for killing a man in a barroom brawl. It was in self-defense but P.M. hadn't defended his brother and he was convicted.

Donald has escaped and wants his brother to help him across the Santa Cruz River into the Mexico-side Nogales, where his wife (Shawn Smith) and children (Kim Charney and Sandy Descher) are in dire straits. The straits get even more dire when P.M. tells him the river is flooded and it will be days before anyone can cross.

P.M. is all atwitter because his wife Nora (Ruth Roman), whom he married after Donald had gone to prison, doesn't know about his jail-bird brother. He introduces Donald to Nora and the rest of his Cadillac Cowboy and ranch society friends as an old friend, Eric Bell, and is kept busy trying to make sure Donald doesn't find anything harder than ginger ale to drink.

Donald gets a telephone call telling him that his family has gone from dire straits to destitution, and when P.M. refuses to help through his contacts in the Mexico side of Nogales, Donald knocks him down, grabs a couple of bottles of whiskey and dashes out of the house into the rain.

Nora eventually discovers Donald's true identity and persuades P.M. to help Donald's family. But after a report that Donald has committed a theft, Hal Breckinridge (Jack Carson) forms a posse to bring Donald back. P.M. is reluctant to aid a felon, but eventually shows Donald a place in the river to cross safely into Mexico, but falls off his horse and then nearly drowns. Donald saves his life, then surrenders to the law.

Cast
 Joseph Cotten as P.M.
 Van Johnson as Donald
 Ruth Roman as Nora
 Jack Carson as Breckinridge
 Brad Dexter as Miller
 Jim Davis as Cady

See also
 List of American films of 1956

References

External links
 
 

20th Century Fox films
1956 films
1956 drama films
American drama films
1950s English-language films
CinemaScope films
Films based on works by Georges Simenon
Films based on Belgian novels
Films set in Nogales, Arizona
Films scored by Leigh Harline
Films directed by Henry Hathaway
1950s American films